Marko Jantunen (born February 14, 1971) is a Finnish ice hockey forward. He was drafted by the Calgary Flames in the 1991 NHL Entry Draft as their 11th round pick, 239th overall.

Playing career
Jantunen began his career in Kiekko-Reipas (later Hockey-Reipas) in 1988, and played there for four seasons. For the 1992–93 season he transferred to KalPa, and in 1993–94 he played for TPS, where he won his first SM-liiga medal, a silver one. He won the Aarne Honkavaara trophy for most regular season goals in the league that season; Jantunen played on TPS's first line with future NHL trophy winners Jere Lehtinen and Saku Koivu.

His career in the Swedish Elitserien started in 1994, when he began his first season with Frölunda HC. Jantunen stayed with Frölunda for five seasons, broken by a short visit to the NHL (see below). In 1999 he transferred to Färjestad BK, where he played for four seasons, until 2003.

He won a silver medal in 1995–96 with Frölunda, and two silver medals and the Elitserien championship in 2001–2002 with Färjestad. During his 374-game tenure in Sweden Jantunen recorded a total of 123 goals and 137 assists.

In April 2003 Jantunen signed a three-year contract with Jokerit, where he was named assistant captain and led the club in scoring with 19 goals during the regular season. He was a team second in overall points, after Glen Metropolit, with 40 points. This total ranked him sixteenth in overall scoring in the league.

In the 2004–05 season Jantunen won the silver medal with Jokerit. He scored 16 goals during the regular season, sharing the Jokerit top goal scorer title with Glen Metropolit and Toni Dahlman. He was second in overall points in the team with 24 assists, again after Glen Metropolit. He scored two short-handed goals in the playoffs.

A foot injury in August 2005 sidelined Jantunen until November. When he returned to action he was named the captain. The spell was however short, as in December he was stripped of his captaincy, and finally in January 2006 Jantunen was released from his contract for disciplinary reasons. He subsequently signed with Timrå IK in the Swedish Elitserien for the remainder of the season.

After the spell with Timrå, Jantunen finally made the long-awaited return home by signing a two-year contract with Lahti Pelicans in April 2006. During the regular season 2006–07 he recorded 41 points in 56 games, which made him the leading scorer of Pelicans (tied with Matias Loppi).

NHL career
Jantunen played three games for the Calgary Flames in 1996–97, scoring no points. He also played 23 games for the Saint John Flames in the AHL, scoring 8 goals and 16 assists.

International play
Jantunen has represented Finland at the under-20's World Championships in 1991, as well as in the 1997 IIHF world championships. During his time in TPS, he played in the European Championships and won the gold medal in 1994; he also won a bronze medal in the EHL for Frölunda in 1997.

Personal life

Awards
 Aarne Honkavaara trophy for most goals scored during regular season play - 1994

Career statistics

Regular season and playoffs

International

References

 Pelicans official website
 
 SM-liiga official website

1971 births
Living people
Calgary Flames draft picks
Calgary Flames players
Färjestad BK players
Finnish ice hockey right wingers
Frölunda HC players
Jokerit players
Lahti Pelicans players
Sportspeople from Lahti
Timrå IK players
HC TPS players